David Rodan (born 8 October 1983) is an Australian rules footballer goal umpire and a retired professional who played for the Richmond Tigers, Port Adelaide Power and the Melbourne Demons.

Of Tongan heritage, Rodan is the first Fijian-born player to reach 100 AFL games.

He is currently an AFL goal umpire.

Early life
David Rodan was born in Fiji to mother Amelia and father David Snr, both of Tongan heritage. He spent his first year in the town of Lami near Suva. When he was three years old, his family moved to Australia. His father wanted him to play rugby union, but there were no rugby clubs for juniors in his area.  Instead, he tried Aussie Rules, beginning junior football with Oak Park and the Holy Child Football Club in Broadmeadows, and he developed a passion for the sport.

Rodan rose through the junior ranks until dominating in the TAC Cup competition, winning back to back Morrish Medals (2000 and 2001).

AFL career

Richmond (2001 - 2006)
Rodan was recruited by AFL club Richmond at the end of 2001 at pick 33.  He played every game for two years (from his debut in 2002), and was nominated for the AFL Rising Star award in his debut season and kicked 17 goals of which three were nominated for the Goal of the Year award.

Playing for Richmond, he played as a small crumbing forward along with Andrew Krakouer in the early part of his career.

He became an Australian citizen in September 2002 in order to get a passport to travel to London, England to participate in an Australian Football Exhibition Match against Essendon as his Fijian passport had expired.

After the retirement of Matthew Knights, Rodan shifted into the midfield.

He did not participate in the 2005 regular season due to a severe knee injury. Rodan made a return to league football in 2006, but was delisted at the end of the season, first hearing of his sacking at the club's best and fairest function via an impromptu speech from captain Kane Johnson.

Port Adelaide (2007 - 2012)

Rodan was given a career lifeline when he was drafted by Port Adelaide with the final selection of the 2006 AFL draft.

Rodan did not miss a game in the 2007 season, which meant he played in the 2007 AFL Grand Final. He received six Brownlow Medal votes at the 2007 medal count including a best on ground 3 votes for his round 12 performance, putting him in the top 60 players in the competition.

Rodan ruptured an anterior cruciate ligament in a training injury in December 2009 and was expected to miss the entire 2010 season.  However, following ligament augmentation and reconstruction surgery, which replaced the torn ligament with one made of polyester fibres, Rodan was able to play in round six, 2010.

Melbourne (2013)
Rodan was traded to the Melbourne Football Club on 25 October 2012. Port Adelaide had initially stated that he had been delisted, but had not formally lodged the paperwork with the AFL allowing a trade to be made between Port Adelaide and Melbourne. He was traded for Pick no. 88 in the 2012 AFL Draft.

Rodan announced his retirement after he ruptured his anterior cruciate ligament again in Round 22 against the Adelaide Crows.

Rodan won the fourteenth season of Dancing with the Stars.

West Preston- Lakeside (2015)
Rodan teamed up with the Northern Football League team West Preston Lakeside for  a two-year period in 2015 and played  a total of 16 games.

VFL Goal Umpiring (2016)
In March 2016, Rodan began training as a VFL goal umpire with his intention to become an AFL-listed goal umpire by 2017. This training opportunity presented itself through the Scanlon Foundation's assistance to introduce people of more indigenous and multicultural backgrounds to Australian rules umpiring. He did so and at the end of 2019 he had goal umpired 27 AFL matches.

References

External links

1983 births
Fijian emigrants to Australia
Australian sportspeople of Tongan descent
Australian people of I-Taukei Fijian descent
Fijian people of Tongan descent
Living people
Port Adelaide Football Club players
Port Adelaide Football Club players (all competitions)
Richmond Football Club players
VFL/AFL players born in Fiji
Australian rules footballers from Victoria (Australia)
Calder Cannons players
Melbourne Football Club players
Dancing with the Stars (Australian TV series) winners
Casey Demons players
Australia international rules football team players
Australian Football League umpires